Agustín Gonzalo Torassa (born 20 October 1988, in Resistencia) is an Argentinian professional footballer who plays as a striker for Gjilani.

Club career

Torassa started his career with Club Atlético All Boys in Argentina.  He signed a 1-year loan deal with FC Red Bull Salzburg of the Österreichische Fußball-Bundesliga in Austria. He returned to Argentina, and signed a deal with Chacarita Juniors, after 6 months in Austria. On 27 January 2016 he signed with Partizani to play in the Kategoria Superiore.

On 31 July 2018, Torassa returned in Albania and joined Flamurtari on a one-year contract. He made 22 appearances and scored 2 goals in the 2018–19 season, including 19 in Kategoria Superiore.

On 14 June 2019, Tirana announced the signing of Torassa on a one-year contract, with an option of a further one. He was allocated squad number 15, making his debut on 24 August in the opening championship match, a 3–0 home win over Luftëtari. Torassa scored his first goal for Tirana on 27 October, the opening in another 3–0 win against the same side, this time at the opposition's turf. On 13 December, Torassa produced a Man of the Match performance against his former side Partizani, setting up his side's first goal for a 2–1 win at the newly built Arena Kombëtare.

References

Honours
Tirana
 Kategoria Superiore: 2019–20

External links
 
 Agustín Torassa at BDFA.com.ar 
 

1988 births
Living people
Footballers from Buenos Aires
Association football forwards
Argentine footballers
All Boys footballers
FC Red Bull Salzburg players
Chacarita Juniors footballers
Club Atlético Tigre footballers
FK Partizani Tirana players
Flamurtari Vlorë players
Yanbian Funde F.C. players
KF Tirana players
China League One players
Argentine Primera División players
Kategoria Superiore players
Argentine expatriate footballers
Expatriate footballers in Austria
Argentine expatriate sportspeople in Austria
Expatriate footballers in China
Argentine expatriate sportspeople in China
Expatriate footballers in Albania
Argentine expatriate sportspeople in Albania